= Socio-economic theory =

Socio-economic theory may refer to:

- Socioeconomics
- A combination of
  - economic theory
  - social theory
